Messila is an area in Kuwait City, located in the Mubarak Al-Kabeer Governorate in Kuwait.

Districts of Mubarak Al-Kabeer Governorate
Populated places in Kuwait